This is a list of number-one hits on the ARIA Club Chart in 2009, compiled by the Australian Recording Industry Association (ARIA) from weekly DJ reports.

2009

Number-one artists

See also
ARIA Charts
List of number-one singles of 2009 (Australia)
List of number-one albums of 2009 (Australia)
2009 in music

References

2009 Club
Australia Club Chart
2009 in Australian music